Hard Grind is the third album by Little Axe, released on June 11, 2002 by On-U Sound Records.

Track listing

Personnel 

Musicians
Tony Duffy – guitar (1)
Alan Glen – harmonica (2, 3, 5, 6, 10)
Kieran Kiely – pipes (3)
Keith LeBlanc – drums (2, 6-11)
Carlton "Bubblers" Ogilvie – keyboards, melodica, backing vocals (4, 10)
Jayme McDonald – vocals (6)
Skip McDonald – guitar, bass guitar, keyboards, backing vocals, producer
Nick Plytas – keyboards (2)
Ghetto Priest – backing vocals (7, 9-11)
Bim Sherman – vocals (11), backing vocals (9)
Doug Wimbish – bass guitar (3, 5-9, 11)

Technical personnel
Alan Branch – engineering
Nick Coplowe – engineering
Darren Grant – engineering
Kevin Metcalfe – mastering
Adrian Sherwood – producer

Release history

In pop culture 
The song "Down to the Valley" was featured in the 2003 Disney film Holes.

References

External links 
 

2002 albums
Albums produced by Adrian Sherwood
Little Axe albums
On-U Sound Records albums